Yeray González Luis (born 3 April 1988), simply known as Yeray, is a Spanish professional footballer who plays for Real Murcia, on loan from Hércules CF, as a midfielder.

Club career
Born in Los Realejos, Santa Cruz de Tenerife, Canary Islands, Yeray made his senior debut with CD Tenerife's C-team in the 2007–08 season, in the regional leagues. Ahead of the 2010–11 campaign, he was promoted to the reserves in Tercera División.

In July 2012, Yeray was promoted to the first team in Segunda División B by manager Álvaro Cervera. He featured regularly as his side achieved promotion to Segunda División, but after being deemed surplus to requirements, he moved to fellow third-tier club Real Unión on 19 August 2013.

Yeray continued to appear in the third division in the following campaigns, representing CD Guijuelo, Hércules CF and Cultural y Deportiva Leonesa; with the latter he achieved promotion to the second tier as champions, contributing with four goals in 40 matches (play-offs included).

Yeray made his professional debut on 18 August 2017, starting in a 0–2 away loss against Lorca FC.

Honours
Cultural Leonesa
Segunda División B: 2016–17

References

External links

1988 births
Living people
People from Tenerife
Sportspeople from the Province of Santa Cruz de Tenerife
Spanish footballers
Footballers from the Canary Islands
Association football midfielders
Segunda División players
Segunda División B players
Tercera División players
CD Tenerife B players
CD Tenerife players
Real Unión footballers
CD Guijuelo footballers
Hércules CF players
Cultural Leonesa footballers
Real Murcia players